Sasmita Mallik (born 10 April 1989, in Aul, Kendrapara) is an Indian women's footballer who played as a left winger for India women's national football team. With 40 goals in 38 matches, she is the highest all-time goalscorer for the Indian women's national team.

Career
Mallik was born in a small village called Aali in the Kendrapara district in Odisha. She was discovered and encouraged to pursue football by Shri Devendra Sharma, the present MLA of Aul. She used to play a lot of local tournaments in Bhubaneswar. Later, she joined the Bhubaneswar Sports Hostel which laid the platform for her to join the National Side. Her first break came in 2004 when glimpses of her exceptional talent impressed all; Team India was then touring China.

She has been playing for the Senior National Team since 2007 and was part of the 2010 South Asian Games and back to back SAFF Women's Championship winning squads. She has also captained India women's national football team several times.

Career statistics

International goals

Honours
India
 SAFF Women's Championship: 2010, 2012, 2016
 South Asian Games Gold medal: 2010, 2016

Orissa
 Senior Women's National Football Championship: 2010–11, runner-up: 2007–08, 2009–10
 National Games Gold medal: 2011

Railways
 Senior Women's National Football Championship: 2015–16

Individual
  AIFF Women's Player of the Year: 2016

References

1989 births
Living people
Indian women's footballers
India women's international footballers
India women's youth international footballers
Footballers at the 2014 Asian Games
Sportswomen from Odisha
People from Kendrapara district
21st-century Indian women
21st-century Indian people
Footballers from Odisha
Indian Women's League players
Women's association football wingers
Asian Games competitors for India
South Asian Games gold medalists for India
South Asian Games medalists in football